The 1948 Kansas State Wildcats football team represented Kansas State University in the 1948 college football season.  Ralph Graham served his first year as the team's head coach.  The Wildcats played their home games in Memorial Stadium. The Wildcats finished the season with a 1–9 record with a 0–6 record in conference play. They finished in last place in the Big Seven Conference.  The Wildcats scored 78 points and gave up 323 points.

The victory against Arkansas State ended an NCAA-record 28-game losing streak.

Schedule

References

Kansas State
Kansas State Wildcats football seasons
Kansas State Wildcats football